Gérald Tenenbaum is a French mathematician and novelist, born in Nancy on 1 April 1952.

He is one of the namesakes of the Erdős–Tenenbaum–Ford constant.

Biography

An alumnus of the École Polytechnique, he has been professor of mathematics at the Institut Élie Cartan at Université de Lorraine (formally université Henri Poincaré, Nancy-1) since 1981.

An associate of Paul Erdős and specialist in analytic and probabilistic number theory, Gérald Tenenbaum received the A-X Gaston Julia prize in 1976, the  Albert Châtelet medal in algebra and number theory in 1985 and, together with Michel Mendès France, the Paul Doistau - Émile Blutet prize from the French Academy of Sciences in 1999 

While continuing his mathematical research activities, he started publishing literary works from the 1980s on: movie criticism in the Belgian magazine Regards, a theater play in 1999, and novels from 2002 on. His novel L'Ordre des jours, published in 2008 by Héloïse d'Ormesson, received the Prix Erckmann-Chatrian the same year.

Selected bibliography

Mathematics 
 (with Richard R. Hall) Divisors, Cambridge, Cambridge University Press, 1988, Cambridge Tracts in Mathematics, vol. 90, .
 Introduction à la théorie analytique et probabiliste des nombres, Institut Elie Cartan, 1990, ; 2nd rev. ed., Paris, Société Mathématique de France, 1995, ; 4th ed., Paris, Belin, 2015, Collection Échelles, ; translated into English, by P. Ion, as Introduction to analytic and probabilistic number theory, Graduate Studies in Mathematics #163, American Mathematical Society 2015, .
 (with Michel Mendès France) Les nombres premiers, Paris, Presses Universitaires de France, 1997, collection Que sais-je? #571; translated into English, by Philip G. Spain, as The Prime Numbers and Their Distribution, American Mathematical Society, 2000, reprinted with corrections 2001, .
 (with Michel Mendès France) Les Nombres premiers, entre l'ordre et le chaos, Dunod, 2011, 2014, .
 Théorie analytique et probabiliste des nombres : 307 exercices corrigés, with the collaboration of Jie Wu, Belin, 2014 .
 Des mots et des maths, Odile Jacob, 2019 .

Literature 
 Trois pièces faciles, drama, L'Harmattan, 1999, .
 Rendez-vous au bord d'une ombre, novel, Le bord de l'eau, 2002, .
 Le Geste, novel, Héloïse d'Ormesson, 2006, .
 Le Problème de Nath, juvenile novel, Belin, 2007, .
 L'Ordre des jours, novel, Héloïse d'Ormessson, 2008, .
 Souffles couplés, novel, Héloïse d'Ormessson, 2010, .
 L'Affinité des traces, novel, Héloïse d'Ormessson, 2012, .
 Peau vive, novel, La Grande Ourse, 2014, .
  Regards d'absence , texts accompanying the drawings of Philippe Ancel, éds. Serge Domini, 2016, 
 Les Harmoniques, novel, Éditions de l'Aube, 2017, 
 Des mots et des maths, essay, Odile Jacob, 2019, .
 Reflets des jours mauves, novel, Héloïse d'Ormesson, 2019,

References

External links 
 Homepage of Gérald Tenenbaum at the Institut Élie Cartan de Lorraine
Homepage of literary activities of Gérald Tenenbaum

Writers from Nancy, France
1952 births
Living people
Number theorists
20th-century French novelists
21st-century French novelists
20th-century French mathematicians
21st-century French mathematicians
French male novelists
20th-century French male writers
21st-century French male writers
Scientists from Nancy, France